(1529 – August 9, 1596), also known as , was a Japanese samurai of the Sengoku period through Azuchi-Momoyama Period, who served the Tokugawa clan. He served as one of Ieyasu's "three magistrates".

Biography
He was known as Hachizo, Sakujuro, or Saemon. Shigetsugu spouse was a daughter of Torii Tadayoshi, and his son was Honda Narishige who eventually became the lord of the Maruoka Domain of the Echizen Province.

Shigetsugu also distinguished himself at Battle of Azukizaka (1564) suppressing the uprising  Ikko sect followers in Mikawa Province.

In 1565 he was named one of Mikawa's San-bugyô, or Three Commissioners (along with Amano Yasukage and Koriki Kiyonaga). Shigetsugu was known for his fortitude, Yasukage for his patience, and Kiyonaga for his leniency. 

At the Siege of Odawara (1590), he intercepted and beat back the naval warriors of Later Hōjō clan led by Kajiwara Kagemune.

Shigetsugu died in 1596 at the age of 68. It is said that he lost one eye and leg from his battle wounds, and he was missing several fingers.

References
 "Honda Shigetsugu, Narishige Fushi Daijiten" (22 Feb. 2008)
 "Honda-shi" on Harimaya.com (22 Feb. 2008)

Honda clan
Samurai
1529 births
1596 deaths
Fudai daimyo